Marangattupilly is a small village and headquarters of Marangattupally Grama Panchayat  in Kottayam district, Kerala. Most of its people are either farmers or engaged in small-scale business. Famous politician K. M. Mani, was born and brought up in this village. Another famous personality from this village is Santhosh George Kulangara. T. K. Jose IAS is from this village.

History
Marangattupilly have a history of 1000 years, initially under the Kingdom of Vadakkancoor. In Malayalam year 925, when the King Marthanda Varma defeated  Kingdom of Vadakkancoor  Marangattupilly become part of Kingdom of Travancore. Marangattupilly also has its share in freedom fighting, with  David Mappila  Muthirakalayil, M. M. Kurian Mattathumanal, A.N. Sankaran Nair Anthanattu, P. R. Achuthan Edappattupadavil, T John Pulikkiyil, Gopalan Nair who were active in the State Congress.

Etymology
Marangattupilly stands for the "region of trees and forest". As Wikipedia itself uses, MARANGATTUPILLY is the correct and commonly used name of the place, instead of marangattupally.

Economy
It is a trading center of natural rubber and majority of people are engaged in rubber cultivation.  The majority of the population belongs to the Catholic community.  St. Francis Assisi Church in Marangattupilly is a famous church and belongs to Pala diocese. Cheradi Bhagavati Temple is the famous Hindu worship place in this area. This Devi Temple is under Travancore Devaswom Board. Marangattupilly has a health center, a police station, a veterinary center, Lions Club and High School- St. Thomas H.S., one cooperative bank (Marangattupally Service CoOperative Bank), and a branch of State Bank of Travancore(SBT), a telephone exchange, electricity board office, a petrol/diesel pump and few shops and a market. It belongs to Kaduthuruthy legislative constituency and Kottayam LS constituency.

Panchayath
Marangattupilly Gramapanchayath in Meenachil Thaluk consists of Kurichithanam, Elackad (Part), Monipally(Part) revenue villages,   with a Population of 21219 and area of  divided into 14 wards. Established on 1953, this was initially called Elakkad Panchayath.
This is a village which maintains peace and harmony among the people living here. The majority of the families in this village are middle class, mostly farmers, but in the recent times as agriculture has lost its value, a lot of people are going abroad, and this is one of the main reasons for the upliftment of this village.

St. Francis Church

Officiated in 1828, St. Francis church is now under Pala diocese. This fairly big parish has more than 700 families

Cheradi Bhagavathi Temple
Cheradi Kavu is one of the important Hindu worship places in Marangattupilly, manages by Travancore Devaswom Board. Durga is the main Idol in this Devi Temple. Meena Pooram is the annual festival. Kumbhakudam, Kalam Karikkal, Para Eduppu, Pooram Idi etc. are the main "Vazhipadu". Deeparadhana with Thiruvaabharana Chaarthu is another specialty on the festival day. Recently the temple has been renovated in a great way.

St. Thomas Highschool
St. Thomas High School
Established in 1951, under Pala corporate educational agency the educational arm of Pala diocese. This is an aided (government-funded) high school, with classes from 5th to 10th, and 325 students.
In 1920, the LP School was established. This institution was transformed into a middle school in 1948, which led to the development of education. In 1951, high school was established. In 1954, S.Sc.C. first went to the batch school. Rev.F.T.T.Abraham was appointed as the headmaster of the post. The school is aimed at enhancing students' artistic, athletic and spiritual development and has a high level of discipline and success.The school is located on the 4 acres of land. The high school has 15 classrooms in 2 buildings. The grounds are beautiful and beautiful basketball courts. 
Non-curricular activities
-Scout & Guides.
-Junior Red Cross
-Class Magazine.
-Kala literary forum.
-Club activities.

Andoor Mahadeva Temple
Sri Mahadeva Temple is also another Hindu worship place situated in Andoor, Kozhikombu.
This is the only Shiva temple in the region. 
The temple is situated in Andoor kara in Maramgattupilly panchayath of Kottayam district. It is 200 meters south of’ Illickal Thazhe’ stop in Pala – Vaikom route.

Andoor Gandharva Temple
It is a very rare gandharva temple as the ‘Prathishta’(Presiding deity) in the main ‘sreekovil ‘ (sanctum sanctorum ) is ‘Gandharva with Yakshi on his laps’. It is a very special feature of the temple and no other Gandharva temple have this.

Besides the presiding deity, there are sub-deities such as ‘Bhagavathi’ facing west, and "sastha’ Rakshas’ and ‘Guru’ facing east.

The centuries-old temple is believed to be built by the then local Nair lords of Pallattu family. The temple and its properties are preserved and maintained by four families of the ancient Pallattu family.A committee of devotees are also present and this committee looks after the day-to-day activities of the temple.

Usually, the temple is opened for poojas in two days in a month(Malayalam era) i.e., the star day "Thiruvonam’ forThiruvona pooja and the end of every Malayalam month for ‘Samkranthi pooja’.

St. Thomas LPS
Established in 1920, is aided school under Pala corporate educational agency.

Labour India

The head office of Labour India Publications, with an educational research and development center and publishing company, and its Gurukulam public school are operating from this small village. The managing director of Labour India Santhosh George Kulangara, is the first Indian space tourist and the host of Sancharam also belongs to this village.

Nearest towns
The nearest towns to Marangattupilly are Uzhavoor and Kuravilangad, and nearest villages are Kadaplamattom, vayala, mannackanad, kurichithanam and Andoor.

Village wards

References

Villages in Kottayam district